Archipelepis is a genus of extinct thelodont agnathans, and are the most primitive recognized thelodonts of which whole body fossils are known. Fossils of bodies and scales are currently known from Late Telychian to Wenlock-aged marine strata of northern Canada.

Anatomy 
Both species have similar body morphology, in that both resembled tadpoles with forked tails. Scale morphology differs in that A. bifurcata has forked scales with two prong-like spires, and that A. turbinata has bulbous, pointed scales that resemble upside-down spinning tops.

References

External links 
 

Thelodonti genera
Silurian jawless fish
Paleozoic life of the Northwest Territories
Canadian Arctic Archipelago
Silurian first appearances
Silurian extinctions
Paleozoic life of Nunavut